is a Japanese futsal club. They play in the F.League Division 2, the league's second tier. The team is located in Shinagawa, Tokyo Prefecture, Japan.

See also
 Japan Football Association (JFA)

References

External links
 Official website 
 Shinagawa City Sport Club 

Futsal clubs in Japan